Jefferson, Arkansas may refer to the following communities:
Jefferson, Columbia County, Arkansas
Jefferson, Jefferson County, Arkansas